The Zambia Police Service is the organisation concerned with maintaining the rule of law in Zambia. It is under the portfolio of the Minister of Home Affairs.

History
On 24 October 1964 Northern Rhodesia gained independence and became the Republic of Zambia. Northern Rhodesia Police (NRP) became the Zambia Police. Lawson Hicks, the last Commissioner of the NRP became the first Commissioner of the Zambia Police. He was succeeded by Michael Mataka who had joined the NRP as a constable in 1941.

Police Ranks and Insignia

Source
International encyclopedia of uniform Insignia

Commissioners and Inspectors- General 
Commissioners of Police
 Mr. Lawson Hicks - 1964-1965
 Mr. Michael Mataka  – 1965—1970
 Mr. Fabiano Chela – 1970—1973

Inspectors-General

 Mr. Fabiano Chela – (1973—1978)
 Mr. Chrispin Katukula  – (1978—1979)
 Mr. Fabiano Chela – (1979—1983)
  Mr. Hebert Mapili  – (1983 —1985)
 Mr. Henry Mtonga  – (1985—1989)
 Mr. Joshua Konayuma - (1989—1990)
 Mr. Zunga Siakalima – (1990—1991)
 Mr. Darius Kalebo  – (1991—1994)
 Mr. Francis Ndlovu – (1994—2000)
 Mr. Silas Ngangula – (2000—2002)
 Mr. Francis Musonda – (2002—2003)
 Mr. Zunga Siakalima  – (2003—2006)
 Mr. Ephraim Mateyo – (2006—2008)
 Mr. Francis Kabonde – (2008—2011)
 Dr. Martin Malama  – (2011—2012)
 Ms. Stella Libongani – (2012—2016)
 Mr. Kakoma Kanganja – (2016—2021)
 Mr. Remmy Kajoba -   (2021-date)

Societal Impact

The Zambia Police Service is almost solely a reactive force and demonstrates rather poor proactive law enforcement techniques and initiative to deter or investigate crime. Police often lack equipment, resources, training, and personnel to respond to calls for assistance or other emergencies. Police response times can be long, if they respond at all. Police often cite a lack of adequate transportation as an excuse for slow/no response.  

Most crimes go unreported and/or uninvestigated. The police have a poor record of solving serious crimes. According to Zambia Police crime statistics for the third quarter of 2019, the nationwide arrest rate from crimes averages 50%. 

Inadequate legislation and investigation results in the lack of prosecution or large numbers of acquittals. Corruption occurs at all levels, resulting in an ineffective legal and justice system. Vigilantism is present as a result.

Low pay and morale create an environment in which bribes of even a few dollars can make allegations or charges disappear. 

The major law enforcement agencies are the Zambia Police Service (a nationwide police force responsible for traditional policing and investigations), Immigration, Customs, the Drug Enforcement Commission, the Anti-Corruption Commission, and the Department of National Parks and Wildlife. There is no dedicated “Border Patrol.” Border security alternates between whichever law enforcement agency may have a presence at a border post at any given time. 

The legislative and constitutional provisions that provide for the Zambia Police Service meet the most basic requirements of the rule of law, which is defined by Carothers as a system in which the laws are public knowledge, are clear, apply to everyone equally, and uphold political and civil liberties.

References

Law enforcement agencies of Zambia